Adair is an unincorporated community and census-designated place (CDP) in McDonough County, Illinois, United States. It is part of New Salem Township. As of the 2020 census, Adair had a population of 212.

Adair was laid out in August 1870 under the name of "Reedyville"; though the name has never been officially changed, the location is known as Adair because that name was given to the post office.

Adair is in eastern McDonough County, along U.S. Route 136 (Main Street). US 136 leads northwest  to Macomb, the county seat, and southeast  to Havana. The Burlington Northern Santa Fe Railway runs through the east side of Adair.

Demographics

References

Census-designated places in McDonough County, Illinois
Census-designated places in Illinois
Unincorporated communities in Illinois
Populated places established in 1870
Unincorporated communities in McDonough County, Illinois
1870 establishments in Illinois